Sharpesburg Township is a non-functioning administrative division of Iredell County, North Carolina, United States. By the requirements of the North Carolina Constitution of 1868, the counties were divided into townships, which included Sharpesburg township as one of sixteen townships in Iredell county.

Geography
Sharpesburg Township is located in the northeastern section of Iredell County.   It is bordered by New Hope Township to the north, Concord Township and the Yadkin River to the south, Olin Township to the east, and Alexander County to the west.  The following streams flow through Sharpesburg Township:  Snow Creek, Buck Branch, Little Rocky Creek, Patterson Creek, Tuckers Creek, and the Yadkin River.

History

Sharpesburg Township was named for William Sharpe (17421818), who lived in the area.  Historic sites within Sharpesburg Township include the Damascus Baptist Church, built in 1855 and the Snow Creek Methodist Church and Burying Ground, built in 18841885.

Another notable resident of Sharpesburg Township was William Franklin Wasson (18581874), who was the Sheriff of Iredell County when Tom Dula was arrested and tried.   Wasson was buried at the Snow Creek Methodist Church Burying Ground.

According to a 1917 map of Sharpesburg Township, the township included the following:
 Damascus Church, pre-Civil War
 Mountain View Church
 Pisguay Church, pre-Civil War
 Pleasant Grove Church
 Rock Hill Church
 Snow Creek United Methodist Church, pre-Civil War
 Central School House
 Colored School House
 Rickert School House
 Rocky Branch School House
 Sunny Side School House
 Guy Mill
 Clio Store

References

Townships in Iredell County, North Carolina
Townships in North Carolina
1868 establishments in North Carolina